Gavria is a former community in the Arta regional unit, Epirus, Greece. Since the 2011 local government reform it is part of the municipality Arta, of which it is a municipal unit. Population 379 (2011).

Demographics

Climate

References

Populated places in Arta (regional unit)